Ignite / Good Riddance is a split EP by the hardcore punk bands Ignite and Good Riddance, released in 1996 through Revelation Records. Good Riddance's tracks were two of seven that had been demoed for their second album A Comprehensive Guide to Moderne Rebellion but had been left off the record; they were recorded in a separate session from the album, with Andy Ernst at Art of Ears, and used on split EPs with Reliance, Ignite, Ill Repute, and Ensign over the following year.

Reflecting on the song "Twenty-One Guns", Good Riddance singer Russ Rankin said it was "a song about the plight of a soldier risking his life in some remote outpost for a cause he isn't privy to. The irony that we flippantly waste so much human life but wait until someone's death to bestow all of this honor and ceremony upon them. Musically a very angry song, very Born Against sounding to me now." "Class War 2000" was influenced musically by T.S.O.L. and lyrically by The Dils' 1977 song "Class War", after which it was titled.

Track listing

Personnel

Ignite 
 Zoli Téglás – vocals
 Joe D. Foster – guitar
 Brett Rasmussen – bass guitar
 Casey Jones – drums

Good Riddance 
 Russ Rankin – vocals
 Luke Pabich – guitar
 Chuck Platt – bass guitar
 Sean Sellers – drums

Production 
 Andy Earnst – recording and mix engineer (Side B)

References

External links 
Ignite / Good Riddance  at Revelation Records

Good Riddance (band) EPs
1996 EPs
Revelation Records EPs
Ignite (band) albums
Split EPs